The Elizabeth Bible is the authorized version of the Bible used by the Russian Orthodox Church. The Elizabeth Bible was the third complete printed edition of the Bible in Church Slavonic, published in Russia in 1751 under and with the assistance of the Russian Empress Elizabeth (the previous ones being the Ostrog Bible of 1581 and the ). 

In 1712, Tsar Peter the Great issued an ukaz ordering the printed Church Slavonic text to be carefully compared with the Greek of the Septuagint and to be made in every respect conformable to it. The revision was completed in 1724 and was ordered to be printed, but the death of Peter (1725) prevented the execution of the order. The manuscript of the Old Testament of this revision is in the synodal library at Moscow.

Under the Empress Elizabeth the work of revision was resumed by an ukaz issued in 1744, and in 1751 a revised Elizabeth Bible, as it is called, was published. Three other editions were published in 1756, 1757, and 1759, the second somewhat revised.

In the main the translation of the Old Testament (excluding Latin Esdras) was based on a manuscript of the Codex Alexandrinus (circa 420) from Brian Walton's London Polyglot (1657). Third Esdras was translated from Vulgate. Also translators used Codex Vaticanus (circa 350), Editio Complutensis (1514-1517), Editio Aldina (1518) and Editio Sixtina (1587) in their work (See Septuagint#Printed editions).

All later reprints of the Russian Church Bible are based upon this second edition (1756), which, with minor corrections, is the current authorized version of the Russian Church.

See also
 Slavic translations of the Bible

References

External links 
 Bible in Church Slavonic text of the Elizabeth Bible (PDF texts in Church Slavonic; webpage in Russian)
 Ostrog Bible (Church Slavonic text with parallel text in Ukrainian; PDF-version of R. Turkonyak's edition)
 Bible in Church Slavonic language - Sinodal redaction (Wikisource), (PDF), (iPhone), (Android) 

Early printed Bibles
Bible translations into Church Slavonic
1751 books
1750s in the Russian Empire
Government reform of Peter the Great